Beatriz Renta (born May 24, 1942) is an Argentine composer, musicologist, and pedagogue.

A native of Buenos Aires, Renta graduated from the Pontifical Catholic University of Argentina. She has composed a number of works for various instruments, many in chamber configurations. Renta has received a number of awards during her career; in 2015 she was honored for her body of work by the Argentine Composers' Association.

References

1942 births
Living people
Argentine classical composers
Women classical composers
Argentine musicologists
Women musicologists
20th-century Argentine musicians
20th-century musicologists
20th-century classical composers
21st-century Argentine musicians
21st-century musicologists
21st-century classical composers
Musicians from Buenos Aires
Pontifical Catholic University of Argentina alumni
20th-century women composers
21st-century women composers
Argentine women composers